John Sheppard Warren (born  November 8, 1960) is a former American football punter in the National Football League (NFL) for the Dallas Cowboys. He played college football at the University of Tennessee.

Early years
Warren attended Wayne County High School where he was considered the state's best punter. Additionally, he was the team's placekicker. 

He practiced baseball and was drafted out of high school by the Cincinnati Reds.

College careers
After receiving Division I NCAA scholarships offers from different schools, he settled on the University of Tennessee. His best season came as a freshman, registering 52 punts for 2,106 yards and a 40.5-yard average. In his last two years he was a backup behind Jimmy Colquitt, with Warren handling the directional punts.

He finished his college career posting 42 games, 133 punts, 5,289 yards and a 39.8-yard average. He also practiced baseball.

Professional career
Warren was signed as an undrafted free agent by the Dallas Cowboys after the 1983 NFL Draft.

In the 70's and early 80's, the Cowboys had the luxury that they didn't need to carry a punter on their roster, because quarterback Danny White could perform that task at a high level. After he was injured in the 1982 NFC championship and placekicker Rafael Septién was forced to be the punter replacement, the team decided to carry Warren as the punter for the 1983 season. As a rookie, he shared punting duties with White, until being placed on the injured reserve list after suffering a right knee injury while covering one of his punts against the Los Angeles Raiders.

In 1984, he became part of a revolving door, where he was released and signed on different times during the season. On August 19, 1985, he was waived after being passed on the depth chart by Mike Saxon.

References

External links
Cowboys' Warren Not Sure If He Is Coming Or Going

1960 births
Living people
People from Jesup, Georgia
Players of American football from Georgia (U.S. state)
American football punters
Tennessee Volunteers football players
Tennessee Volunteers baseball players
Dallas Cowboys players